The Syrian Basketball Federation is the governing body of basketball in Syria. It organizes national professional championships men, women and youth, while it is also responsible for holding the  cup of the country. It also coordinates the Syria men's national basketball team and the Syria women's national basketball team.

The federation founded in 1947, represents basketball with public authorities as well as with national and international sports organizations and as such with Syria in international competitions. It also defends the moral and material interests of Basketball in Syria. It is affiliated with FIBA and FIBA Asia.

As of early December 2021, the president has been Taríf Koutrach.

Leagues
Syrian Basketball League
Syrian Basketball Cup
Syrian Basketball Super Cup
Syrian Basketball Women League
Syrian Basketball Women Cup

National teams
Men's (Senior, U-19, U-17)
Women's (Senior, U-19, U-17)

References

External links
Official website of the Syrian Basketball Federation
FIBA Profile

1947 establishments in Syria
Basketball in Syria
Basketball governing bodies in Asia
Sports organizations established in 1947